The degree Celsius is the unit of temperature on the Celsius scale (originally known as the centigrade scale outside Sweden), one of two temperature scales used in the International System of Units (SI), the other being the Kelvin scale. The degree Celsius (symbol: °C) can refer to a specific temperature on the Celsius scale or a unit to indicate a difference or range between two temperatures. It is named after the Swedish astronomer Anders Celsius (1701–1744), who developed a similar temperature scale in 1742. Before being renamed in 1948 to honour Anders Celsius, the unit was called centigrade, from the Latin centum, which means 100, and gradus, which means steps. Most countries use this scale; the other major scale, Fahrenheit, is still used in the United States, some island territories, and Liberia. The Kelvin scale is of use in the sciences, with  representing absolute zero.

Since 1743, the Celsius scale has been based on 0 °C for the freezing point of water and 100 °C for the boiling point of water at 1 atm pressure. Prior to 1743 the values were reversed (i.e. the boiling point was 0 degrees and the freezing point was 100 degrees). The 1743 scale reversal was proposed by Jean-Pierre Christin.

By international agreement, between 1954 and 2019 the unit  and the Celsius scale were defined by absolute zero and the triple point of water. After 2007, it was clarified that this definition referred to Vienna Standard Mean Ocean Water (VSMOW), a precisely defined water standard. This definition also precisely related the Celsius scale to the scale of the kelvin, the SI base unit of thermodynamic temperature with symbol K. Absolute zero, the lowest temperature possible, is defined as being exactly 0 K and −273.15 °C. Until 19 May 2019, the temperature of the triple point of water was defined as exactly .

On 20 May 2019, the kelvin was redefined so that its value is now determined by the definition of the Boltzmann constant rather than being defined by the triple point of VSMOW. This means that the triple point is now a measured value, not a defined value. The newly-defined exact value of the Boltzmann constant was selected so that the measured value of the VSMOW triple point is exactly the same as the older defined value to within the limits of accuracy of contemporary metrology. The temperature in degree Celsius is now defined as the temperature in kelvins subtracted by 273.15, meaning that a temperature difference of one degree Celsius and that of one kelvin are exactly the same, and that the degree Celsius remains exactly equal to the kelvin (i.e., 0 °C remains exactly 273.15 K).

History

In 1742, Swedish astronomer Anders Celsius (1701–1744) created a temperature scale that was the reverse of the scale now known as "Celsius": 0 represented the boiling point of water, while 100 represented the freezing point of water. In his paper Observations of two persistent degrees on a thermometer, he recounted his experiments showing that the melting point of ice is essentially unaffected by pressure. He also determined with remarkable precision how the boiling point of water varied as a function of atmospheric pressure. He proposed that the zero point of his temperature scale, being the boiling point, would be calibrated at the mean barometric pressure at mean sea level. This pressure is known as one standard atmosphere. The BIPM's 10th General Conference on Weights and Measures (CGPM) in 1954 defined one standard atmosphere to equal precisely 1,013,250 dynes per square centimeter (101.325 kPa).

In 1743, the Lyonnais physicist Jean-Pierre Christin, permanent secretary of the Academy of Lyon, inverted the Celsius scale so that 0 represented the freezing point of water and 100 represented the boiling point of water. Some credit Christin for independently inventing the reverse of Celsius' original scale, while others believe Christin merely reversed Celsius' scale. On 19 May 1743 he published the design of a mercury thermometer, the "Thermometer of Lyon" built by the craftsman Pierre Casati that used this scale.

In 1744, coincident with the death of Anders Celsius, the Swedish botanist Carl Linnaeus (1707–1778) reversed Celsius's scale. His custom-made "linnaeus-thermometer", for use in his greenhouses, was made by Daniel Ekström, Sweden's leading maker of scientific instruments at the time, whose workshop was located in the basement of the Stockholm observatory.

The first known Swedish document reporting temperatures in this modern "forward" Celsius scale is the paper Hortus Upsaliensis dated 16 December 1745 that Linnaeus wrote to a student of his, Samuel Nauclér. In it, Linnaeus recounted the temperatures inside the orangery at the University of Uppsala Botanical Garden:

Centigrade vis-à-vis Celsius

Since the 19th century, the scientific and thermometry communities worldwide have used the phrase "centigrade scale" and temperatures were often reported simply as "degrees" or, when greater specificity was desired, as "degrees centigrade", with the symbol °C.

In the French language, the term centigrade also means one hundredth of a gradian, when used for angular measurement. The term centesimal degree was later introduced for temperatures but was also problematic, as it means gradian (one hundredth of a right angle) in the French and Spanish languages. The risk of confusion between temperature and angular measurement was eliminated in 1948 when the 9th meeting of the General Conference on Weights and Measures and the Comité International des Poids et Mesures (CIPM) formally adopted "degree Celsius" for temperature.

While "Celsius" is the term commonly used in scientific work, "centigrade" remains in common use in English-speaking countries, especially in informal contexts.  

While in  Australia from 1 September 1972, only Celsius measurements were given for temperature in weather reports/forecasts, it was not until February 1985 that the weather forecasts issued by the BBC switched from "centigrade" to "Celsius".

Common temperatures
All phase transitions are at standard atmosphere. Figures are either by definition, or approximated from empirical measurements.

Name and symbol typesetting
The "degree Celsius" has been the only SI unit whose full unit name contains an uppercase letter since 1967, when the SI base unit for temperature became the kelvin, replacing the capitalized term degrees Kelvin. The plural form is "degrees Celsius".

The general rule of the International Bureau of Weights and Measures (BIPM) is that the numerical value always precedes the unit, and a space is always used to separate the unit from the number,  (not "" or ""). The only exceptions to this rule are for the unit symbols for degree, minute, and second for plane angle (°, ′, and ″, respectively), for which no space is left between the numerical value and the unit symbol. Other languages, and various publishing houses, may follow different typographical rules.

Unicode character
Unicode provides the Celsius symbol at code point . However, this is a compatibility character provided for roundtrip compatibility with legacy encodings. It easily allows correct rendering for vertically written East Asian scripts, such as Chinese. For searching, treat these two sequences as identical."

Temperatures and intervals
The degree Celsius is subject to the same rules as the kelvin with regard to the use of its unit name and symbol. Thus, besides expressing specific temperatures along its scale (e.g. "Gallium melts at 29.7646 °C" and "The temperature outside is 23 degrees Celsius"), the degree Celsius is also suitable for expressing temperature intervals: differences between temperatures or their uncertainties (e.g. "The output of the heat exchanger is hotter by 40 degrees Celsius", and "Our standard uncertainty is ±3 °C"). Because of this dual usage, one must not rely upon the unit name or its symbol to denote that a quantity is a temperature interval; it must be unambiguous through context or explicit statement that the quantity is an interval. This is sometimes solved by using the symbol °C (pronounced "degrees Celsius") for a temperature, and C° (pronounced "Celsius degrees") for a temperature interval, although this usage is non-standard.

Celsius measurement follows an interval system but not a ratio system; and it follows a relative scale not an absolute scale. For example, an object at 20 °C does not have twice the energy of when it is 10 °C; and 0 °C is not the lowest Celsius value. Thus, degrees Celsius is a useful interval measurement but does not possess the characteristics of ratio measures like weight or distance.

Coexistence of Kelvin and Celsius scales
In science and in engineering, the Celsius scale and the Kelvin scale are often used in combination in close contexts, e.g. "a measured value was 0.01023 °C with an uncertainty of 70 μK". This practice is permissible because the magnitude of the degree Celsius is equal to that of the kelvin. Notwithstanding the official endorsement provided by decision no. 3 of Resolution 3 of the 13th CGPM, which stated "a temperature interval may also be expressed in degrees Celsius", the practice of simultaneously using both °C and K remains widespread throughout the scientific world as the use of SI-prefixed forms of the degree Celsius (such as "μ°C" or "microdegrees Celsius") to express a temperature interval has not been well adopted.

Melting and boiling points of water

The melting and boiling points of water are no longer part of the definition of the Celsius scale. In 1948, the definition was changed to use the triple point of water. In 2005 the definition was further refined to use water with precisely defined isotopic composition (VSMOW) for the triple point. In 2019, the definition was changed to use the Boltzmann constant, completely decoupling the definition of the kelvin from the properties of water. Each of these formal definitions left the numerical values of the Celsius scale identical to the prior definition to within the limits of accuracy of the metrology of the time.

When the melting and boiling points of water ceased being part of the definition, they became measured quantities instead. This is also true of the triple point. 

In 1948 when the 9th General Conference on Weights and Measures (CGPM) in Resolution 3 first considered using the triple point of water as a defining point, the triple point was so close to being 0.01 °C greater than water's known melting point, it was simply defined as precisely 0.01 °C. However, later measurements showed that the difference between the triple and melting points of VSMOW is actually very slightly (< 0.001 °C) greater than 0.01 °C. Thus, the actual melting point of ice is very slightly (less than a thousandth of a degree) below 0 °C. Also, defining water's triple point at 273.16 K precisely defined the magnitude of each 1 °C increment in terms of the absolute thermodynamic temperature scale (referencing absolute zero). Now decoupled from the actual boiling point of water, the value "100 °C" is hotter than 0 °C – in absolute terms – by a factor of exactly  (approximately 36.61% thermodynamically hotter). When adhering strictly to the two-point definition for calibration, the boiling point of VSMOW under one standard atmosphere of pressure was actually 373.1339 K (99.9839 °C). When calibrated to ITS-90 (a calibration standard comprising many definition points and commonly used for high-precision instrumentation), the boiling point of VSMOW was slightly less, about 99.974 °C.

This boiling-point difference of 16.1 millikelvins between the Celsius scale's original definition and the previous one (based on absolute zero and the triple point) has little practical meaning in common daily applications because water's boiling point is very sensitive to variations in barometric pressure. For example, an altitude change of only 28 cm (11 in) causes the boiling point to change by one millikelvin.

See also
Comparison of temperature scales
Degree of frost
Thermodynamic temperature

Notes

References

External links

NIST, Basic unit definitions: Kelvin
The Uppsala Astronomical Observatory, History of the Celsius temperature scale
London South Bank University, Water, scientific data
BIPM, SI brochure, section 2.1.1.5, Unit of thermodynamic temperature
TAMPILE, Comparison of temperature scales

SI derived units
Scales of temperature
Swedish inventions
1742 introductions
18th-century inventions
Scales in meteorology